The first rockets were used as propulsion systems for arrows, and may have appeared as early as the 10th century in Song dynasty China. However more solid documentary evidence does not appear until the 13th century. The technology probably spread across Eurasia in the wake of the Mongol invasions of the mid-13th century. Usage of rockets as weapons before modern rocketry is attested to in China, Korea, India, and Europe. One of the first recorded rocket launchers is the "wasp nest" fire arrow launcher produced by the Ming dynasty in 1380. In Europe rockets were also used in the same year at the Battle of Chioggia. The Joseon kingdom of Korea used a type of mobile multiple rocket launcher known as the "Munjong Hwacha" by 1451.

The use of rockets in war became outdated by 15th century. The use of rockets in wars was revived with the creation of iron-cased rockets, which were used by Kingdom of Mysore (Mysorean rockets) and by Marathas during the mid 18th century,  and were later modified and used by the British. The later models and improvements were known as the Congreve rocket and used in the Napoleonic Wars.

China

The dating of the invention of the first rocket, otherwise known as the gunpowder propelled fire arrow, is disputed. The History of Song attributes the invention to two different people at different times, Feng Zhisheng in 969 and Tang Fu in 1000. However Joseph Needham argues that rockets could not have existed before the 12th century, since the gunpowder formulas listed in the Wujing Zongyao are not suitable as rocket propellant.

A "flying fire-lance" that had re-usable barrels was also mentioned to have been used by the Jin dynasty (1115–1234). Rockets are recorded to have been used by the Song navy in a military exercise dated to 1245. Internal-combustion rocket propulsion is mentioned in a reference to 1264, recording that the 'ground-rat,' a type of firework, had  frightened the Empress-Mother Gongsheng at a feast held in her honor by her son the Emperor Lizong.

Subsequently, rockets are included in the military treatise Huolongjing, also known as the Fire Drake Manual, written by the Chinese artillery officer Jiao Yu in the mid-14th century. This text mentions the first known multistage rocket, the 'fire-dragon issuing from the water' (huo long chu shui), thought to have been used by the Chinese navy.

Rocket launchers known as "wasp nests" were ordered by the Ming army in 1380. In 1400, the Ming loyalist Li Jinglong used rocket launchers against the army of Zhu Di (Yongle Emperor).

The American historian Frank H. Winter proposed in The Proceedings of the Twentieth and Twenty-First History Symposia of the International Academy of Astronautics that southern China and the Laotian community rocket festivals might have been key in the subsequent spread of rocketry in the Orient.

Spread of rocket technology

Mongols
The Chinese fire arrow was adopted by the Mongols in northern China, who employed Chinese rocketry experts as mercenaries in the Mongol army. Rockets are thought to have spread via the Mongol invasions to other areas of Eurasia in the mid 13th century.

Rocket-like weapons are reported to have been used at the Battle of Mohi in the year 1241.

Middle East
Between 1270 and 1280, Hasan al-Rammah wrote his al-furusiyyah wa al-manasib al-harbiyya (The Book of Military Horsemanship and Ingenious War Devices), which included 107 gunpowder recipes, 22 of which are for rockets. According to Ahmad Y Hassan, al-Rammah's recipes were more explosive than rockets used in China at the time. The terminology used by al-Rammah indicates a Chinese origin for the gunpowder weapons he wrote about, such as rockets and fire lances. Ibn al-Baitar, an Arab from Spain who had immigrated to Egypt, described saltpeter as "snow of China". Al-Baytar died in 1248. The earlier Arab historians called saltpeter "Chinese snow" and " Chinese salt."
The Arabs used the name "Chinese arrows" to refer to rockets. The Arabs called fireworks "Chinese flowers". While saltpeter was called "Chinese Snow" by Arabs, it was called "Chinese salt" ( namak-i čīnī) by the Iranians, or "salt from the Chinese marshes".

India

Mercenaries are recorded to have used hand held rockets in India in 1300. By the mid-14th century Indians were also using rockets in warfare.

The Kingdom of Mysore used rockets during the 18th century during the Anglo-Mysore Wars and wars against British. According to James Forbes Marathas also used iron-encased rockets in their battles.

Korea
The Korean kingdom of Joseon started producing gunpowder in 1374 and was producing cannons and rockets by 1377. However the multiple rocket launching carts known as the "Munjong hwacha" did not appear until 1451.

Europe
In Europe, Roger Bacon mentions gunpowder in his Opus Majus of 1267.

However rockets do not feature in European warfare until the 1380 Battle of Chioggia.

Jean Froissart (c. 1337 – c. 1405) had the idea of launching rockets through tubes, so that they could make more accurate flights. Froissart's idea is a forerunner of the modern bazooka.

Adoption in Renaissance-era Europe
According to the 18th-century historian Ludovico Antonio Muratori, rockets were used in the war between the Republics of Genoa and Venice at Chioggia in 1380. It is uncertain whether Muratori was correct in his interpretation, as the reference might also have been to bombard, but
Muratori is the source for the widespread claim that the earliest recorded European use of rocket artillery dates to 1380.
Konrad Kyeser described rockets in his famous military treatise Bellifortis around 1405.
Kyeser describes three types of rockets, swimming, free flying and captive.

Joanes de Fontana in Bellicorum instrumentorum liber (c. 1420) described flying rockets in the shape of doves, running rockets in the shape of hares, and a large car driven by three rockets, as well as a large rocket torpedo with the head of a sea monster.

In the mid-16th century, Conrad Haas wrote a book that described rocket technology that combined fireworks and weapons technologies. This manuscript was discovered in 1961, in the Sibiu public records (Sibiu public records Varia II 374). His work dealt with the theory of motion of multi-stage rockets, different fuel mixtures using liquid fuel, and introduced delta-shape fins and bell-shaped nozzles.

The name Rocket comes from the Italian rocchetta, meaning "bobbin" or "little spindle", given due to the similarity in shape to the bobbin or spool used to hold the thread to be fed to a spinning wheel. The Italian term was adopted into German in the mid 16th century, by Leonhard Fronsperger in a book on rocket artillery published in 1557, using the spelling rogete, and by Conrad Haas as rackette; adoption into English dates to ca. 1610. Johann Schmidlap, a German fireworks maker, is believed to have experimented with staging in 1590.

Early modern history

Lagari Hasan Çelebi was a legendary Ottoman aviator who, according to an account written by Evliya Çelebi, made a successful manned rocket flight. Evliya Çelebi purported that in 1633 Lagari launched in a 7-winged rocket using 50 okka (63.5 kg, or 140 lbs) of gunpowder from Sarayburnu, the point below Topkapı Palace in Istanbul.

Siemienowicz
"Artis Magnae Artilleriae pars prima" ("Great Art of Artillery, the First Part", also known as "The Complete Art of Artillery"), first printed in Amsterdam in 1650, was translated to French in 1651, German in 1676, English and Dutch in 1729 and Polish in 1963. For over two centuries, this work of Polish–Lithuanian Commonwealth nobleman Kazimierz Siemienowicz was used in Europe as a basic artillery manual. The book provided the standard designs for creating rockets, fireballs, and other pyrotechnic devices. It contained a large chapter on caliber, construction, production and properties of rockets (for both military and civil purposes), including multi-stage rockets, batteries of rockets, and rockets with delta wing stabilizers (instead of the common guiding rods).

Anderson 
In his 1696 work, ‘The Making of Rockets. In two Parts. The First containing the Making of Rockets for the meanest Capacity. The other to make Rockets by a Duplicate Proposition, to 1,000 pound Weight or higher,’ Robert Anderson proposed constructing rockets out of "a piece of a Gun Barrel" whose metal casing is much stronger than pasteboard or wood.

Indian Mysorean rockets

In 1792, iron-cased rockets were successfully used by Tipu Sultan - the ruler of the Kingdom of Mysore (in India) against the larger British East India Company forces during the Anglo-Mysore Wars. The British then took an active interest in the technology and developed it further during the 19th century. Use of iron tubes for holding propellant enabled higher thrust and longer range for the missile (up to 2 km range).

After Tipu's defeat in the Fourth Anglo-Mysore War and the capture of the Mysore iron rockets, they were influential in British rocket development, inspiring the Congreve rocket, which was soon put into use in the Napoleonic Wars.

19th-century gunpowder-rocket artillery

William Congreve (1772-1828), son of the Comptroller of the Royal Arsenal, Woolwich, London, became a major figure in the field. From 1801 Congreve researched the original design of Mysore rockets and started a vigorous development program at the Arsenal's laboratory. Congreve prepared a new propellant mixture, and developed a rocket motor with a strong iron tube with conical nose. This early Congreve rocket weighed about 32 pounds (14.5 kilograms). The Royal Arsenal's first demonstration of solid-fuel rockets took place in 1805. The rockets were effectively used during the Napoleonic Wars and the War of 1812. Congreve published three books on rocketry.

Subsequently, the use of military rockets spread throughout the western world. At the Battle of Baltimore in 1814, the rockets fired on Fort McHenry by the rocket vessel HMS Erebus were the source of the rockets' red glare described by Francis Scott Key in "The Star-Spangled Banner". Rockets were also used in the Battle of Waterloo in 1815.

Early rockets were very inaccurate. Without the use of spinning or any controlling feedback-loop, they had a strong tendency to veer sharply away from their intended course. The early Mysorean rockets and their successor British Congreve rockets reduced veer somewhat by attaching a long stick to the end of a rocket (similar to modern bottle rockets) to make it harder for the rocket to change course. The largest of the Congreve rockets was the 32-pound (14.5 kg) Carcass, which had a 15-foot (4.6 m) stick. Originally, sticks were mounted on the side, but this was later changed to mounting them in the center of the rocket, reducing drag and enabling the rocket to be more accurately fired from a segment of pipe.

In 1815 Alexander Dmitrievich Zasyadko (1779-1837) began his work on developing military gunpowder-rockets. He constructed rocket-launching platforms (which allowed firing of rockets in salvos - 6 rockets at a time) and gun-laying devices. Zasyadko elaborated a tactic for military use of rocket weaponry. In 1820 Zasyadko was appointed head of the Petersburg Armory, Okhtensky Powder Factory, pyrotechnic laboratory and the first Highest Artillery School in Russia. He organized rocket production in a special rocket workshop and formed the first rocket sub-unit in the Imperial Russian Army.

Artillery captain Józef Bem (1794-1850) of the Kingdom of Poland started experiments with what was then called in Polish raca kongrewska. These culminated in his 1819 report Notes sur les fusees incendiares (German edition: Erfahrungen über die Congrevischen Brand-Raketen bis zum Jahre 1819 in der Königlichen Polnischen Artillerie gesammelt, Weimar 1820). The research took place in the Warsaw Arsenal, where captain Józef Kosiński also developed multiple-rocket launchers adapted from horse artillery gun carriage. The 1st Rocketeer Corps formed in 1822; it first saw combat during the Polish–Russian War 1830–31.

Accuracy greatly improved in 1844 when William Hale modified the rocket design so that thrust was slightly vectored, causing the rocket to spin along its axis-of-travel like a bullet. The Hale rocket removed the need for a rocket stick, travelled further due to reduced air-resistance, and was far more accurate.

In 1865 the British Colonel Edward Mounier Boxer built an improved version of the Congreve rocket by placing two rockets in one tube, one behind the other.

Early 20th-century rocket pioneers

At the beginning of the 20th century, there was a burst of scientific investigation into interplanetary travel, fueled by the creativity of fiction writers such as Jules Verne and H. G. Wells as well as philosophical movements like Russian cosmism. Scientists seized on the rocket as a technology that was able to achieve this in real life, a possibility first recognized in 1861 by William Leitch.

In 1903, high school mathematics teacher Konstantin Tsiolkovsky (1857–1935), inspired by Verne and Cosmism, published The Exploration of Cosmic Space by Means of Reaction Devices (The Exploration of Cosmic Space by Means of Reaction Devices), the first serious scientific work on space travel. The Tsiolkovsky rocket equation—the principle that governs rocket propulsion—is named in his honor (although it had been discovered previously, Tsiolkovsky is honored as being the first to apply it to the question of whether rockets could achieve speeds necessary for space travel). He also advocated the use of liquid hydrogen and oxygen for propellant, calculating their maximum exhaust velocity. His work was essentially unknown outside the Soviet Union, but inside the country it inspired further research, experimentation and the formation of the Society for Studies of Interplanetary Travel in 1924.

In 1912, Robert Esnault-Pelterie published a lecture on rocket theory and interplanetary travel. He independently derived Tsiolkovsky's rocket equation, did basic calculations about the energy required to make round trips to the Moon and planets, and he proposed the use of atomic power (i.e. radium) to power a jet drive.

In 1912 Robert Goddard, inspired from an early age by H.G. Wells and by his personal interest in science, began a serious analysis of rockets, concluding that conventional solid-fuel rockets needed to be improved in three ways. First, fuel should be burned in a small combustion chamber, instead of building the entire propellant container to withstand the high pressures. Second, rockets could be arranged in stages. Finally, the exhaust speed (and thus the efficiency) could be greatly increased to beyond the speed of sound by using a De Laval nozzle. He patented these concepts in 1914. He also independently developed the mathematics of rocket flight.
Goddard worked on developing solid-propellant rockets since 1914, and demonstrated a light battlefield rocket to the US Army Signal Corps only five days before the signing of the armistice that ended World War I. He also started developing liquid-propellant rockets in 1921, yet he had not been taken seriously by the public. Nevertheless, Goddard reclusively developed and flew a small liquid-fueled rocket. He developed the technology for 214 patents, 212 of which his wife published after his death.

During World War I Yves Le Prieur, a French naval officer and inventor, later to create a pioneering scuba diving apparatus, developed air-to-air solid-fuel rockets. The aim was to destroy observation captive balloons (called saucisses or Drachens) used by German artillery. These rather crude black powder, steel-tipped incendiary rockets made by the Ruggieri firm  were first tested from a Voisin aircraft, wing-bolted on a fast Picard Pictet sports car and then used in battle on real aircraft. A typical layout was eight electrically fired Le Prieur rockets fitted on the interpane struts of a Nieuport aircraft. If fired at sufficiently short distance, a spread of Le Prieur rockets proved to be quite deadly. Belgian ace Willy Coppens claimed dozens of Drachen kills during World War I.

In 1920, Goddard published his ideas and experimental results in A Method of Reaching Extreme Altitudes. The work included remarks about sending a solid-fuel rocket to the Moon, which attracted worldwide attention and was both praised and ridiculed. A New York Times editorial suggested, referring to Newton's Third Law.

In reality, in terms of Newton's third law, a rocket "pushes against" its exhaust gases, so the lack of surrounding air is not relevant.

In 1923, German Hermann Oberth (1894–1989) published Die Rakete zu den Planetenräumen ("The Rocket into Planetary Space"), a version of his doctoral thesis, after the University of Munich had rejected it. In 1929, he published a book, Wege zur Raumschiffahrt ("Ways to Spaceflight"), and static-fired an uncooled liquid-fueled rocket engine for a brief time.

In 1924, Tsiolkovsky also wrote about multi-stage rockets, in 'Cosmic Rocket Trains'.

Modern rocketry

Pre-World War II

Modern rockets originated in the US when Robert Goddard attached a supersonic (de Laval) nozzle to the combustion chamber of a liquid-fueled rocket engine. This turned the hot combustion chamber gas into a cooler, highly directed hypersonic jet of gas, more than doubling the thrust and raising the engine efficiency from 2% to 64%. On 16 March 1926, Goddard launched the world's first liquid-fueled rocket in Auburn, Massachusetts.

During the 1920s, a number of rocket research organizations appeared worldwide. Rocketry in the Soviet Union began in 1921 with extensive work at the Gas Dynamics Laboratory (GDL), where the first test-firing of a solid fuel rocket was carried out in March 1928, which flew for about 1,300 meters In 1931 the world's first successful use of rockets to assist take-off of aircraft were carried out on a U-1, the Soviet designation for a Avro 504 trainer, which achieved about one hundred successful assisted takeoffs. Further developments in the early 1930s included firing rockets from aircraft and the ground. In 1932 in-air test firings of RS-82 missiles from an Tupolev I-4 aircraft armed with six launchers successfully took place.

In 1933 GDL and GIRD were merged to form the Reactive Scientific Research Institute (RNII) and developments were continued, including designing several variations for ground-to-air, ground-to-ground, air-to-ground and air-to-air combat. The RS-82 rockets were carried by Polikarpov I-15, I-16 and I-153 fighter planes, the Polikarpov R-5 reconnaissance plane and the Ilyushin Il-2 close air support plane, while the heavier RS-132 rockets could be carried by bombers.  Many small ships of the Soviet Navy were also fitted with the RS-82 rocket, including the MO-class small guard ship. The earliest known use by the Soviet Air Force of aircraft-launched unguided anti-aircraft rockets in combat against heavier-than-air aircraft took place in August 1939, during the Battle of Khalkhin Gol. A group of Polikarpov I-16 fighters under command of Captain N. Zvonarev were using RS-82 rockets against Japanese aircraft, shooting down 16 fighters and 3 bombers in total. Six Tupolev SB bombers also used RS-132 for ground attack during the Winter War. RNII also built over 100 experimental rocket engines under the direction of Valentin Glushko. Design work included regenerative cooling, hypergolic propellant ignition, and swirling and bi-propellant mixing fuel injectors. However, Glushko's arrest during Stalin's Great Purge in 1938 curtailed the developments.

 In 1927 the German car manufacturer Opel began to research rocket vehicles together with Max Valier and the solid-fuel rocket builder Friedrich Wilhelm Sander. These activities are generally considered the world's first large-scale experimental rocket program, Opel-RAK under the leadership of Fritz von Opel, leading to the first rocket cars and rocket planes, which paved the way for the German V2 program and US and Soviet activities from 1950 onwards. In 1928, Fritz von Opel drove a rocket car Opel RAK.1 on the Opel raceway in Rüsselsheim, Germany, and later the dedicated RAK2 rocket car at the AVUS speedway in Berlin. In 1928, Opel, Valier and Sander equipped the Lippisch Ente glider, which Opel had purchased, with rocket power and launched the manned glider. The "Ente" was destroyed on its second flight. Eventually glider pioneer Julius Hatry was tasked by von Opel to construct a dedicated glider, again called Opel-RAK.1, for his rocket program. On September 30, 1929 von Opel himself piloted the RAK.1, the world's first public manned rocket-powered flight from the Frankfurt-Rebstock airport, but experienced a hard landing.  The Opel-RAK program and the spectacular public demonstrations of ground and air vehicles drew large crowds and caused global public excitement known as "rocket rumble", and had a large long-lasting impact on later spaceflight pioneers, in particular Wernher von Braun. Sixteen-year old von Braun was so enthusiastic about the public Opel-RAK demonstrations, that he constructed his own homemade rocket car, nearly killing himself in the process,  and causing a major disruption in a crowded street by detonating the toy wagon to which he had attached fireworks. He was taken into custody by the local police until his father came to get him. The Great Depression put an end to the Opel-RAK program and von Opel left Germany in 1930, emigrating first to the US, later to France and Switzerland. After the break-up of the Opel-RAK program, Valier eventually was killed while experimenting with liquid-fueled rockets in May 1930, and is considered the first fatality of the dawning space age.

 In Germany, engineers and scientists became enthralled with liquid propulsion, building and testing them in the late 1920s within Opel RAK in Rüsselsheim. According to Max Valier's account, Opel RAK rocket designer, Friedrich Wilhelm Sander launched two liquid-fuel rockets at Opel Rennbahn in Rüsselsheim on April 10 and April 12, 1929. These Opel RAK rockets have been the first European, and after Goddard the world's second, liquid-fuel rockets in history. These properties indicate a gas pressure pumping. The first missile rose so quickly that Sander lost sight of it. Two days later, a second unit was ready to go. Sander tied a  rope to the rocket. After half the rope had been unwound, the line broke and this rocket also was lost, probably near the Opel proving ground and racetrack in Rüsselsheim, the "Rennbahn". The main purpose of these tests was to develop an aircraft propulsion system for crossing the English channel. Also, spaceflight historian Frank H. Winter, curator at the National Air and Space Museum in Washington, DC, confirms that in addition to solid-fuel rockets used for land-speed records and the world's first manned rocket-plane flights, the Opel group was working on liquid-fuel rockets (SPACEFLIGHT, Vol. 21,2, Feb. 1979): In a cabled exclusive to The New York Times on 30 September 1929, von Opel is quoted as saying: "Sander and I now want to transfer the liquid rocket from the laboratory to practical use. With the liquid rocket I hope to be the first man to thus fly across the English Channel. I will not rest until I have accomplished that." At a speech on the donation of a RAK 2 replica to the Deutsches Museum, von Opel mentioned engineer Josef Schaberger as a key collaborator. "He belonged," von Opel said, "with the same enthusiasm as Sander to our small secret group, one of the tasks of which was to hide all the preparations from my father, because his paternal apprehensions led him to believe that I was cut out for something better than being a rocket researchist. Schaberger supervised all the details involved in construction and assembly (of rocket cars), and every time I sat behind the wheel with a few hundred pounds of explosives in my rear, and made the first contact, I did so with a feeling of total security [...] As early as 1928, Mr. Schaberger and I developed a liquid rocket, which was definitely the first permanently operating rocket in which the explosive was injected into the combustion chamber and simultaneously cooled using pumps. [...] We used benzol as the fuel," von Opel continued, "and nitrogen tetroxide as the oxidizer. By May 1929, the engine produced a thrust of 200 kg (440 lb.) The Great Depression brought an end to the Opel RAK activities. The work of Sander and Valier, who died while experimenting in 1930, was confiscated by the Heereswaffenamt and integrated into the activities under General Walter Dornberger in the early and mid-1930s in a field near Berlin.

An amateur rocket group, the VfR, co-founded by Max Valier, included Wernher von Braun, who eventually became the head of the army research station that designed the V-2 rocket weapon for the Nazis. When private rocket-engineering became forbidden in Germany, Sander was arrested by Gestapo in 1935, convicted of treason, sentenced to 5 years in prison, and forced to sell his company. He died in 1938.

Lieutenant Colonel Karl Emil Becker, head of the German Army's Ballistics and Munitions Branch, gathered a small team of engineers that included Walter Dornberger and Leo Zanssen, to figure out how to use rockets as long-range artillery in order to get around the Treaty of Versailles' ban on research and development of long-range cannons. Wernher von Braun, a young engineering prodigy who as an eighteen-year-old student helped Hermann Oberth build his liquid rocket engine, was recruited by Becker and Dornberger to join their secret army program at Kummersdorf-West in 1932. Von Braun dreamed of conquering outer space with rockets and did not initially see the military value in missile technology.

In 1927 a team of German rocket engineers, including Opel RAK's Max Valier, had formed the Verein für Raumschiffahrt (Society for Space Travel, or VfR), and in 1931 launched a liquid propellant rocket (using oxygen and gasoline).

Similar work was done from 1932 onwards by the Austrian professor Eugen Sänger, who migrated to Germany in 1936 and worked on rocket-powered spaceplanes such as Silbervogel (sometimes called the "antipodal" bomber).

On November 12, 1932 at a farm in Stockton NJ, the American Interplanetary Society's attempt to static-fire their first rocket (based on German Rocket Society designs) failed in a fire.

In 1936, a British research programme based at Fort Halstead in Kent under the direction of Dr. Alwyn Crow started work on a series of unguided solid-fuel rockets that could be used as anti-aircraft weapons. In 1939, a number of test firings were carried out in the British colony of Jamaica, on a specially built range.

In the 1930s, the German Reichswehr (which in 1935 became the Wehrmacht) began to take an interest in rocketry. Artillery restrictions imposed by the 1919 Treaty of Versailles limited Germany's access to long-distance weaponry. Seeing the possibility of using rockets as long-range artillery fire, the Wehrmacht initially funded the VfR team, but because their focus was strictly scientific, created its own research team. At the behest of military leaders, Wernher von Braun, at the time a young aspiring rocket scientist, joined the military (followed by two former VfR members) and developed long-range weapons for use in World War II by Nazi Germany.

In June 1938, the Soviet Reactive Scientific Research Institute (RNII) began developing a multiple rocket launcher based on the RS-132 rocket. In August 1939, the completed rocket was the BM-13 / Katyusha rocket launcher (BM stands for боевая машина (translit. boyevaya mashina), 'combat vehicle' for M-13 rockets). Towards the end of 1938 the first significant large scale testing of the rocket launchers took place, 233 rockets of various types were used. Various rocket tests were conducted through 1940, and the BM-13-16 with launch rails for sixteen rockets was authorized for production. Only forty launchers were built before Germany invaded the Soviet Union in June 1941.

World War II

At the start of the war, the British had equipped their warships with unrotated projectile unguided anti-aircraft rockets, and by 1940, the Germans had developed a surface-to-surface multiple rocket launcher, the Nebelwerfer.

The Soviet Katyusha rocket launchers were top secret in the beginning of World War II. A special unit of the NKVD troops was raised to operate them. On July 14, 1941, an experimental artillery battery of seven launchers was first used in battle at Rudnya in Smolensk Oblast of Russia, under the command of Captain Ivan Flyorov, destroying a concentration of German troops with tanks, armored vehicles and trucks at the marketplace, causing massive German Army casualties and its retreat from the town in panic. After their success in the first month of the war, mass production was ordered and the development of other models proceeded. The Katyusha was inexpensive and could be manufactured in light industrial installations which did not have the heavy equipment to build conventional artillery gun barrels. By the end of 1942, 3,237 Katyusha launchers of all types had been built, and by the end of the war total production reached about 10,000. with 12 million rockets of the RS type produced for the Soviet armed forces.

During the Second World War, Major-General Dornberger was the military head of the army's rocket program, Zanssen became the commandant of the Peenemünde army rocket center, and von Braun was the technical director of the ballistic missile program. They led the team that built the Aggregat-4 (A-4) rocket, which became the first vehicle to reach outer space during its test flight program in 1942 and 1943. Its supersonic speed meant there was no defense against it, and radar detection provided little warning. Germany used the weapon to bombard southern England and parts of Allied-liberated western Europe from 1944 until 1945. After the war, the V-2 became the basis of early American and Soviet rocket designs.

In 1943, production of the V-2 rocket began in Germany. The vehicle was similar to most modern rockets, with turbopumps, inertial guidance and many other features. Thousands were fired at various Allied nations, mainly Belgium, as well as England and France. While they could not be intercepted, their guidance system design and single conventional warhead meant that they were insufficiently accurate against military targets. A total of 2,754 people in England were killed, and 6,523 were wounded before the launch campaign was ended. There were also 20,000 deaths of slave labour during the construction of V-2s. While it did not significantly affect the course of the war, the V-2 provided a lethal demonstration of the potential for guided rockets as weapons.

In parallel with the guided missile programme in Nazi Germany, rockets were also used on aircraft, either for assisting horizontal take-off (RATO), vertical take-off (Bachem Ba 349 "Natter") or for powering them (Me 163, etc.). During the war Germany also developed several guided and unguided air-to-air, ground-to-air and ground-to-ground missiles (see list of World War II guided missiles of Germany).

Post World War II

At the end of World War II, competing Russian, British, and US military and scientific crews raced to capture technology and trained personnel from the German rocket program at Peenemünde. Russia and Britain had some success, but the United States benefited the most. The US captured a large number of German rocket scientists, including von Braun, and brought them to the United States as part of Operation Paperclip. In America, the same rockets that were designed to rain down on Britain were used instead by scientists as research vehicles for developing the new technology further. The V-2 evolved into the American Redstone rocket, used in the early space program.

After the war, rockets were used to study high-altitude conditions, by radio telemetry of temperature and pressure of the atmosphere, detection of cosmic rays, and further research; notably the Bell X-1, the first manned vehicle to break the sound barrier. This continued in the US under von Braun and the others, who were destined to become part of the US scientific community.

Independently, in the Soviet Union's space program research continued under the leadership of the chief designer Sergei Korolev. With the help of German technicians, the V-2 was launched and duplicated as the R-1 missile. German designs were abandoned in the late 1940s, and the foreign workers were sent home. A new series of engines built by Glushko and based on inventions of Aleksei Mihailovich Isaev formed the basis of the first ICBM, the R-7. The R-7 launched the first satellite, Sputnik 1, and later Yuri Gagarin, the first man into space, and the first lunar and planetary probes. This rocket is still in use today. These prestigious events attracted the attention of top politicians, along with additional funds for further research.

One problem that had not been solved was atmospheric reentry. It had been shown that an orbital vehicle easily had enough kinetic energy to vaporize itself, and yet it was known that meteorites can make it down to the ground. The mystery was solved in the US in 1951 when H. Julian Allen and A. J. Eggers, Jr. of the National Advisory Committee for Aeronautics (NACA) made the counterintuitive discovery that a blunt shape (high drag) permitted the most effective heat shield. With this type of shape, around 99% of the energy goes into the air rather than the vehicle, and this permitted safe recovery of orbital vehicles.

The Allen and Eggers discovery, initially treated as a military secret, was eventually published in 1958. Blunt body theory made possible the heat shield designs that were embodied in the Mercury, Gemini, Apollo, and Soyuz space capsules, enabling astronauts and cosmonauts to survive the fiery re-entry into Earth's atmosphere. Some spaceplanes such as the Space Shuttle made use of the same theory. At the time the STS was being conceived, Maxime Faget, the Director of Engineering and Development at the Manned Spacecraft Center, was not satisfied with the purely lifting re-entry method (as proposed for the cancelled X-20 "Dyna-Soar"). He designed a space shuttle which operated as a blunt body by entering the atmosphere at an extremely high angle of attack of 40° with the underside facing the direction of flight, creating a large shock wave that would deflect most of the heat around the vehicle instead of into it. Throughout re-entry, the Shuttle rolled to change lift direction in a prescribed way, keeping maximum deceleration well below 2 gs. These roll maneuvers allowed the Shuttle to use its lift to steer toward the runway.

Cold War

Rockets became extremely important militarily as modern intercontinental ballistic missiles (ICBMs) when it was realized that nuclear weapons carried on a rocket vehicle were essentially impossible for existing defense systems to stop once launched, and launch vehicles such as the R-7, Atlas, and Titan became delivery platforms for these weapons.

Fueled partly by the Cold War, the 1960s became the decade of rapid development of rocket technology particularly in the Soviet Union (Vostok, Soyuz, Proton) and in the United States (e.g. the X-15 and X-20 Dyna-Soar aircraft). There was also significant research in other countries, such as France, Britain, Japan, Australia, etc., and a growing use of rockets for Space exploration, with pictures returned from the far side of the Moon and unmanned flights for Mars exploration.

In America, the manned spaceflight programs, Project Mercury, Project Gemini, and later the Apollo program, culminated in 1969 with the first manned landing on the Moon using the Saturn V, causing the New York Times to retract its earlier 1920 editorial implying that spaceflight couldn't work:

In the 1970s, the United States made five more lunar landings before cancelling the Apollo program in 1975. The replacement vehicle, the partially reusable Space Shuttle, was intended to be cheaper,  but no large reduction in costs was achieved. Meanwhile, in 1973, the expendable Ariane programme was begun, a launcher that by the year 2000 would capture much of the geosat market.

Market competition

Since the early 2010s, new private options for obtaining spaceflight services emerged, bringing substantial market competition into the existing launch service provider business.
Initially, these market forces have manifest through competitive dynamics among payload transport capabilities at diverse prices having a greater influence on rocket launch purchasing than the traditional political considerations of country of manufacture or the particular national entity using, regulating or licensing the launch service.

Following the advent of spaceflight technology in the late 1950s, space launch services came into being, exclusively by national programs. Later in the 20th century commercial operators became significant customers of launch providers. International competition for the communications satellite payload subset of the launch market was increasingly influenced by commercial considerations. However, even during this period, for both commercial- and government-entity-launched commsats, the launch service providers for these payloads used launch vehicles built to government specifications, and with state-provided development funding exclusively.

In the early 2010s, privately developed launch vehicle systems and space launch service offerings emerged. Companies now faced economic incentives rather than the principally political incentives of the earlier decades. The space launch business experienced a dramatic lowering of per-unit prices along with the addition of entirely new capabilities, bringing about a new phase of competition in the space launch market.

See also
Jet aircraft
Rocket
Rocket engine

References

Bibliography
 
 
 
 .
 
 
 
 .
 .
 
 
 .

 
 
 .
 
 .
 .
 .
 
 
 
 
 .
 Hadden, R. Lee. 2005. "Confederate Boys and Peter Monkeys." Armchair General. January 2005. Adapted from a talk given to the Geological Society of America on March 25, 2004.
 
 
 
 
 
 .
 .
 .
 
 
 
 .
 .
 
 
 
 .
 
 

 
 
 
 .
 
 
 .
 
 
 .
 .
 
 .
 .
 
 .
 
 
 
 
 
 
 
 Schmidtchen, Volker (1977a), "Riesengeschütze des 15. Jahrhunderts. Technische Höchstleistungen ihrer Zeit", Technikgeschichte 44 (2): 153–173 (153–157)
 Schmidtchen, Volker (1977b), "Riesengeschütze des 15. Jahrhunderts. Technische Höchstleistungen ihrer Zeit", Technikgeschichte 44 (3): 213–237 (226–228)
 
 .
 
 .
 
 
 
 
 

Rocketry
Rockets